Keeper(s) of the Flame or Flamekeeper(s) may refer to:

Film and television
 Keeper of the Flame (film), a 1942 American film directed by George Cukor
 Keepers of the Flame, a 2005 documentary film produced by Eddie Kamae
 Keepers of the Flame, a 2003 play by Sean O'Brien
 Keepers of the Flame, a 2014 Australian BBQ cooking show hosted by Henry Wagons

Music
 Flamekeeper, the backup band for Michael Cleveland

Albums
 Keeper of the Flame (Golden Earring album) or the title song, 1989
 Keeper of the Flame (The Hiatus album), 2014
 Keeper of the Flame (Richie Cole album) or the title song, 1978
 Keeper of the Flame, by Nina Simone, 1967
 Keeper of the Flame, by Caroline Henderson, 2009
 Keeper of the Flame, by Delbert McClinton, 1979
 Keeper of the Flame, by Luka Bloom, 2000
 Keepers of the Flame, by the Charles Earland Tribute Band, including Eric Alexander, 2002
 Keepers of the Flame, by JGB, 2006
 Keepers of the Flame, by Phoenyx, a band co-founded by Alexander James Adams, 1990

Songs
 "Keeper of the Flame" (song), by Martin Page, 1995
 "Keeper of the Flame", by A-ha from Analogue, 2005
 "Keeper of the Flame", by Miranda Lambert from The Weight of These Wings, 2016
 "Keepers of the Flame", by Kevin Kern from Imagination's Light, 2005

Other uses
 Keepers of the Flame: Understanding Amnesty International, a 2006 book by Stephen Hopgood
 Keepers of the Flame Fraternity, an organization within the Church Universal and Triumphant
 Flamekeepers, the title for the volunteers of the 2015 European Games

See also 
 Strážce plamene (lit. The Flamekeeper), a 2006 album by Petr Hapka and Michal Horáček